Parathesis seibertii is a species of plant in the family Primulaceae. It is found in Costa Rica and Panama. It is threatened by habitat loss.

References

seibertii
Flora of Costa Rica
Flora of Panama
Taxonomy articles created by Polbot